St Michael and All Angels is a grade II listed Church of England church at Chase Side, Enfield, London.

Designed by Richard Herbert Carpenter in an imitation of a 14th-century Gothic style, the church was begun in 1873 as a chapel of ease to the parish church of St Andrew. The following year a shortage of funds brought construction to a halt, and the west end was closed off with a temporary wall. Built of ragstone, the church consists of a three-bay aisled nave, a north transept, and a vaulted apsidal chancel, arranged in a manner advocated by the Tractarian Movement. The temporary wall was finally replaced with a stone wall and a narthex in 1963.

A parish was formed in 1931.

References

External links

http://www.stmichaelsenfield.org.uk/

Enfield
Buildings and structures in the London Borough of Enfield
Diocese of London
Grade II listed churches in London
Enfield, London